The Siva S160 Spyder is an automobile which was produced during the 1970s in Great Britain by Siva Engineering.      

Conceived as a Hillman Imp-engined GT car for British sports car manufacturer Marcos, the car was ultimately re-designed to become the Siva S160 Spyder. The S160 debuted at the 1971 Racing Car Show, utilizing a Volkswagen Beetle floor pan and running gear and featuring a gullwing coupé body. It was offered as a complete car or as a bare bodyshell. A total of twelve S160s were produced.

Siva Spyder in miniature
A model of the Siva Spyder was included as number 41 in the Matchbox Superfast range from 1973 to 1978.

References

Sports cars
Automobiles with gull-wing doors
Rear-engined vehicles
Cars of England
Kit cars
Cars introduced in 1971